The Champion of the World (German: Der Meister der Welt) is a 1927 German silent film directed by Gennaro Righelli and starring Fred Solm, Xenia Desni and Olga Tschechowa. The film's art direction was by Julius von Borsody. It premiered at the Marmorhaus in Berlin.

Cast
 Fred Solm 
 Xenia Desni 
 Olga Tschechowa
 Henri De Vries
 Angelo Ferrari 
 Paul Graetz 
 Dolly Grey 
 Antonie Jaeckel 
 Fritz Kampers 
 Harry Lamberts-Paulsen

References

Bibliography
 Hans-Michael Bock and Tim Bergfelder. The Concise Cinegraph: An Encyclopedia of German Cinema. Berghahn Books.

External links

1927 films
Films of the Weimar Republic
Films directed by Gennaro Righelli
German silent feature films
German black-and-white films
Running films